Roshan Alam (born 20 April 1995) is an Indian cricketer who plays first-class cricket for Assam. Alam made his first-class debut for Assam on 17 November 2011 in the 2011-12 Ranji Trophy against Hyderabad in Guwahati. He made his List A debut on 25 September 2019, for Assam in the 2019–20 Vijay Hazare Trophy. He made his Twenty20 debut on 12 November 2019, in the 2019–20 Syed Mushtaq Ali Trophy.

References

External links
 

1995 births
Living people
Indian cricketers
Assam cricketers